Madre (Mother) Pascalina Lehnert (25 August 1894 – 13 November 1983), born Josefina Lehnert, was a German Roman Catholic sister who served as Pope Pius XII's housekeeper and secretary from his period as Apostolic Nuncio to Bavaria in 1917 until his death as pope in 1958. She managed the papal charity office for Pius XII from 1944 until the pontiff's death in 1958. She was a Sister of the Holy Cross, Menzingen order.

Early career
"Madre Pascalina", as she was called, led Eugenio Pacelli's household in the nunciature in Munich, Bavaria, from 1917 to 1925 and in the nunciature to Germany and Prussia in Berlin from 1925 to 1929, where Nuncio Pacelli was Dean of the Diplomatic Corps. There she became known for organizing the Pacelli parties, "which were auspicious, tastefully sprinkling glitter with the strictest European etiquette. ...The nunciature was soon a major center of Germany’s social and official worlds. Streams of aristocrats, including President Paul von Hindenburg (one of Germany’s Field Marshals during World War I) were frequent callers, blending with students and workers, anyone whom Pacelli, the shrewdest of diplomats, chose to smile upon."

Pacelli was recalled to Rome in 1929 to become Cardinal Secretary of State. Madre Pascalina soon resided as housekeeper with two other sisters in the Vatican and were the only women inside the Papal conclave, which, on 2 March 1939, elected Pacelli to become the successor of Pope Pius XI.

Papacy of Pius XII

Papal Charities
Pius XII responded to Madre Pascalina in the aftermath of the war by organizing a two-tier papal charity. Monsignore Ferdinando Baldelli, Carlo Egger and Otto Faller started on behalf of the pope the official Pontificia Commissione di Assistenza. Madre Pascalina was asked by the Pope to direct his personal charity efforts, officially under Monsignor Montini, later Pope Paul VI, with whom she seemed to have a complicated relationship. To assist the pope in the many calls for his help and charity, Pascalina organized and led the Magazzino, a private papal charity office which employed up to 40 helpers and continued until 1959. "It started from modest beginnings and became a gigantic charity."

By Christmas 1944, housing had been provided at the Papal Palace of Castel Gandolfo for 15,000 refugees from the invading Nazi forces. Inside the Vatican, Mother Pascalina was in charge of housing, clothing and food for as many Jewish refugees as the walls could hold. By the end of the war, no less than 200,000 Jews had been sheltered and fed inside the Holy City under her supervision. In addition to this, 12,000 packages were delivered to the children of Rome alone, many of which were handed out by Pope Pius XII himself. Lehnert organized truck caravans filled with medicine, clothing, shoes and food to prison camps and hospitals, provided first aid, food and shelter for bomb victims, fed the hungry population of Rome, answered emergency calls to the Pope for aid, and sent care packages to France, Poland, Czechoslovakia, Germany and Austria and other countries.

After the war, the calls for papal help continued in war-torn Europe: Madre Pascalina organized emergency aid to displaced persons, prisoners of war, victims of floods, and many victims of the war. She distributed also hundreds of religious items to needy priests. In later years, priests with very large parishes received small cars or motor bikes. The Pope would ask bishops from the United States, Argentina, Brazil, Switzerland, Canada, Mexico, and other countries for help.

Planned Second Vatican Council
According to Father Charles T. Murr, Pascalina lamented that Pius XII had not called the Second Vatican Council as he had been planning to do for many years. Pascalina stated that Pius XII had planned for the council to offer an unequivocal condemnation of communism. Murr states that Pascalina was unhappy with the final results of the council, but she did not reject it.

Later life
After the election of Pope John XXIII, she seemed to be in agreement with the opinion of Konrad Adenauer who told her that “We have a clown sitting on the throne of Saint Peter!”. When Pope Paul VI took office, Pascalina initially remained silent on him out of respect, but later described him as "weak" and "disappointing". She also believed the accusations that Annibale Bugnini was a freemason. After the election of Pope John Paul II, she was highly pleased, having better hopes for him than his two immediate predecessors.

In recognition of her achievements, John XXIII awarded Mother Pascalina the papal honor Pro Ecclesia et Pontifice.

Autobiography
Madre Pascalina wrote her autobiography in 1959. Church authorities permitted its publication only in 1982. In some 200 pages she describes the human qualities and sense of humor of Eugenio Pacelli (Pope Pius XII), whom she served for 41 years. It also describes historical events such the papal conclave of 1939, occurrences during World War II, the consistory of 1946, beatifications, the Holy Year 1950, and the illness and death of the pope. Madre Pascalina also published several articles, in which she described the daily life and routine of the pontiff.

Honors
In 1958 Madre Pascalina was awarded the Pro Ecclesia et Pontifice (For the Church and the Pope) medal by Pope John XXIII. In 1969 she received the Order of Merit of the Federal Republic of Germany (Bundesverdienstkreuz) from West Germany and in 1980 the Bavarian Order of Merit. In 1981, the Austrian President awarded her the Decoration of Honour for Services to the Republic of Austria (Goldenes Ehrenzeichen für Verdienste um die Republik Österreich).

Death
Madre Pascalina died from a cerebral hemorrhage in Vienna, aged 89, in 1983. She is buried at the Vatican Camposanto (cemetery). Several bishops and cardinals, among them Joseph Cardinal Ratzinger, also Bavarian, attended her funeral.

Works
Lehnert, Pascalina. Ich durfte Ihm Dienen, Erinnerungen an Papst Pius XII. Naumann, Würzburg, 1986
Lehnert, Pascalina; Susan Johnson (transl.). His Humble Servant: Sister M. Pascalina Lehnert's Memoirs of Her Years of Service to Eugenio Pacelli, Pope Pius XII. Saint Augustine's Press, South Bend. February 2014. . (first English translation)

Sources
Lehnert, Pascalina. Ich durfte Ihm Dienen, Erinnerungen an Papst Pius XII. Naumann, Würzburg, 1986
Lehnert, P. Brief (Letter of Madre Pascalina), Archiv Institut Menzingen, 1 February 1944
Lehnert, P. Brief (Letter of Madre Pascalina), Archiv Institut Menzingen, 16 February 1944
Lehnert, P. Brief (Letter of Madre Pascalina), Archiv Institut Menzingen, 7 April 1944
Lehnert, P. Brief (Letter of Madre Pascalina), Archiv Institut Menzingen, 19 May 1944
Lehnert, P. La giornata del pontefice Pio XII, Osservatore Romano, Città del Vaticano, 22 March 1952
Mazzolari, Primo. La carità del papa, Pio XII e la ricostruzione dell’Italia, Edizione Paoline, 1991
Schad, Marta. Gottes mächtige Dienerin, Schwester Pascalina und Papst Pius XII. Herbig, München, 2007

References

External link

1894 births
1983 deaths
Pope Pius XII advisers
20th-century German Roman Catholic nuns
People from Ebersberg (district)
People from the Kingdom of Bavaria
Women and the papacy
Conclavists
Commanders Crosses of the Order of Merit of the Federal Republic of Germany